Disney Masters is a series of books collecting anthologies of critically acclaimed Walt Disney Donald Duck and Mickey Mouse international comic artists. Italian artist Romano Scarpa was the first featured creator in the series, in the volume titled The Delta Dimension. The publisher behind the project is Fantagraphics Books. The first book of the series was released in May 2018.

Format

Each book in the series is hardcover with dimensions measuring 7.5 inches × 10.25 inches, (191 mm × 260 mm). Each volume is printed in full color and contains about 200 pages. Supplementary materials such as art, biographies of the artists and essays are included as well. The MSRP for each single volume is set at $29.99 for volumes collecting around 200 pages and $34.99 for volumes collecting near 250 pages.

While the volumes are titled with one central figure, some volumes also include stories from a secondary main character.

Volumes of the series are primarily sold separately and in boxed sets, but the first five volumes are also available for purchase as a set via a subscription from the publisher. The release schedule for the series is five volumes a year, starting in May 2018. There are two types of boxed collections; one type collecting the volumes in chronological release order, and the other collecting volumes by the books' main character.

Volumes and box sets

Box sets

Related

Free Comic Book Day 2020

In December 2019 it was announced that Fantagraphics was going to be participating in the promotion campaign Free Comic Book Day on May 2, 2020; with an issue showcasing their Disney Masters series. The free comic book released for the promotion would be titled Disney Masters: Donald Duck, and would feature reprints of the stories: "It's Bats Man" starring Donald Duck by William Van Horn, "The Health Nut" by Dick Kinney and Al Hubbard, which is the story that introduced Fethry Duck into the duck universe, and a story with Scrooge McDuck, "Much Ado About Telepathy" by Evert Geradts and Mau Heymans.

Due to the 2020 pandemic the Free Comic Book Day event was postponed and changed from its regular one day-event in May to be a Summer event taking place over several weeks from July to September. Fantagraphics Books' Disney Masters FCBD issue was released August 19, 2020.

Free Comic Book Day 2022

For FCBD of 2022 Fantagraphics released a new free issue, with once again the title, Disney Masters: Donald Duck; this time featuring: The Scrooge McDuck tale "Snore Losers" by William Van Horn, the Super Goof adventure "Here Today, Gone Apollo" by Giorgio Cavazzano and the Fethry Duck story "Fall Guy" written by Dick Kinney with art by Al Hubbard.

See also

Walt Disney's Mickey Mouse

References

External links
Publisher website - Fantagraphics - Disney Masters
Disney Masters at the INDUCKS

Mickey Mouse comics
Donald Duck comics
Comic book collection books
American comics
European comics
Mickey Mouse
Donald Duck
Fantagraphics titles
Disney comics titles